The 2018–19 NBB Cup was the 51st edition of the Netherlands' national basketball cup tournament. Donar was the defending champion. ZZ Leiden won its third national cup.

Format
In the first, second and third round teams from the Dutch second, third and fourth division participate. From the fourth round, teams from the Dutch Basketball League (DBL) enter the competition. Quarter- and semi-finals are played in a two-legged format. When a team form a tier lower than the DBL played a DBL team, one win is sufficient for the latter to advance to the next round.

Bracket

Semi-finals
The draw for the semi-finals was held on 18 January 2019.

First leg
The result of the first match between Windmills and Landstede was changed after four days, from 72–72 to 72–73, as a free throw was missed in the boxscore.

Second leg

Final

Winning roster

See also
2018–19 Dutch Basketball League

References

NBB Cup
NBB Cup